Luke Pratt (born 8 October 1989) is an Australian rules footballer.  He plays as a running defender and was selected by AFL club Fremantle with their second selection (22nd overall) in the 2007 AFL Rookie draft.

Pratt played for Swan Districts in the West Australian Football League between 2008 and 2010 after being a member of their 2007 Colts Premiership winning team.

In May 2009 Pratt was elevated to the senior list when Rhys Palmer was moved to the long-term injury list.  He then made his AFL debut for Fremantle in Round 7 of the 2009 AFL season at Carrara Stadium against Carlton, as a replacement for the injured Ryan Crowley. That was his first and only AFL game. At times during the game he played on former Swan Districts teammate and fellow first game player Chris Yarran.

He was not offered another contract after the 2009 season.

References

External links

WAFL Online Statistics

Fremantle Football Club players
Swan Districts Football Club players
1989 births
Living people
Australian rules footballers from Western Australia